Alexander K. McClure School is a historic elementary school located in the Hunting Park neighborhood of Philadelphia, Pennsylvania. It is part of the School District of Philadelphia. The building was designed by Henry deCourcy Richards and built in 1910–1911. It is a three-story, five bay, brick building with a raised basement in the Colonial Revival-style.  It features a three-story, rounded arched opening above the entrance, stone trim, and a rounded parapet. An addition was built in 1967. The school was named for journalist and politician Alexander Kelly McClure.

The building was added to the National Register of Historic Places in 1988.

References

External links

 Alexander K. McClure School Website

School buildings on the National Register of Historic Places in Philadelphia
Colonial Revival architecture in Pennsylvania
School buildings completed in 1911
Hunting Park, Philadelphia
Elementary schools in Philadelphia
School District of Philadelphia
1911 establishments in Pennsylvania